The Devil River is a river of New Zealand's Tasman Region.

See also
List of rivers of New Zealand

References

Land Information New Zealand - Search for Place Names

Rivers of the Tasman District
Kahurangi National Park
Rivers of New Zealand